JOE (JOE.ie and JOE.co.uk) is a distributed social media publisher aimed at young people in Ireland and the UK, with over 2 million unique visitors per month. It is owned by Maximum Media. They are politically left-wing.

Background 

The publisher's original website Joe.ie was founded by Irish entrepreneur Niall McGarry. Her.ie is a related website aimed at young women in Ireland. HerFamily.ie also forms part of the publishing group.

JOE.ie 
The website was founded in 2010 and nominated in October of that year for a Golden Spider Award in the One to Watch category.

It was nominated again for a Golden Spider Award in the News and Entertainment category in 2013.

Irish showbiz website Goss.ie described it as "more influential" than traditional media in August 2016. It was edited by Paddy McKenna.

Audience and reach 
The site's Android app has had over 50,000 installs with a ratio of 2:1 for 5 star reviews vs 1 star reviews.

In November 2016, The Advertising Standards Authority for Ireland upheld a complaint about an advert for Sprite which was featured on the site.

SportsJOE.ie 
SportsJOE.ie was launched in 2014, as an offshoot of JOE.ie, offering "in-depth analysis". Daily Telegraph and Sunday Independent sports columnist Dion Fanning moved to the site in 2015.

JOE.co.uk 
Millennial media website JOE.co.uk was launched in September 2015 with Tony Barrett of The Times and former footballer Ledley King among the contributors.

BBC political researcher Joey D'Urso cited content from JOE.co.uk, such as a video superimposing Labour leader Jeremy Corbyn's face onto that of the rapper Stormzy while the leader appears "to rap a list of policies", as an example of viral social media content which helped Labour's standing in the 2017 general election (especially among the youth), but which was not directly funded by the party itself.

In 2018, the company hired Brian Whelan from Channel 4 News to oversee video operations and the BBC's Simon Clancy to run their podcast shows.

In 2020, JOE and Swedemason won the 2020 "Content Creator of the Year" award in The Drum's online media awards for their viral videos of mashing up politicians' words to fit a song.

References

External links 

Irish news websites
British news websites
Men's websites